Bolgheri is a central Italian village and hamlet (frazione) of Castagneto Carducci, a municipality (comune) in the province of Livorno, Tuscany. in 2011 it had a population of 131.

History
First mentioned in 1075, in a papal bull by Pope Gregory VII, its name derives from Bulgari (Italian for "Bulgarians"), due to the presence of a military camp of Bulgarians, allies of the Lombards.

Geography
Bolgheri lies in the foothills of the Colline Metallifere, south of Bibbona ( north).

Main sights 
San Sebastiano
Santi Jacopo e Cristoforo
Sant'Antonio 
 Castle of Bolgheri

Wine

Bolgheri became an internationally known region following an event in 1974 arranged by Decanter where a 6-year-old Sassicaia won over an assortment of Bordeaux wines. Prior to this, Bolgheri had been relatively anonymous producers of ordinary white wines and rosés.

Due to the particular characteristics of the soil and micro climate sunny, dry and moderately windy, the grape varieties of Bordeaux origin tend to thrive, such as Cabernet Sauvignon, Merlot, Cabernet Franc and Petit Verdot.

Among the most known "Super Tuscan" producers are Tenuta San Guido who produce Sassicaia, Tenuta Dell'Ornellaia who produce Ornellaia, and Ca'Marcanda of Gaja, Guado al Tasso of Antinori.

In 2017, in Bolgheri opened The World Wine Town of Castagneto Carducci – a wine center, created by entrepreneur Franco Malenotti and designed by the Oscar-winning art director Dante Ferretti. The Sensory and Multimedia Museum in Bolgheri is housed in a two-story building (dating back to the 1500s), exploring the history of wine and food from the region and featuring a wine tasting area.

Bolgheri DOC
The current set of DOC regulations for Bolgheri red wines became approved in 1994. Before the creation of this DOC, the "Super Tuscans" from the area were typically sold under the simpler designations Vino da tavola or IGT Toscana.

The appellation rules determine that in Bolgheri Rosso and Bolgheri Rosé, Sangiovese may be utilised only to a degree of 70%, and in excess of this a wine must be classified IGT. Cabernet Sauvignon from 10 to 80%, Merlot, up to 80% and other local red varieties, up to 30%. Rosso must be aged for 24 months.

For Bolgheri Bianco, Tuscan Trebbiano from 10 to 70%, Vermentino from 10 to 70%, Sauvignon blanc from 10 to 70% and other local white varieties, up to 30%.

Two varietal wines are permitted, Sauvignon blanc and Vermentino, of which there must be at least 85% of either grape variety.

For the appellation's pink Vin Santo, Occhio di Pernice, 50 to 70% Sangiovese, Malvasia from 50 to 70%, and up to 30% of other local red varieties. It must be aged for 36 months.

The sub-zone Sassicaia has its own appellation declaration, with up to 85% of Cabernet Sauvignon and 15% Cabernet Franc. Bolgheri Sassicaia must be aged for 26 months. It is expected to be upgraded to DOCG status.

Transport

Gallery

Personalities
Giosuè Carducci (1835–1907), poet and writer

See also
Tuscan wine
Tenuta San Guido

References

Consorzio Bolgheri Bolgheri DOC regulations

Footnotes

External links

 Bolgheri DOC Consortium official site
 Bolgheri and Bolgheri Sassicaia (DOC) The Italian Trade Commission

Frazioni of the Province of Livorno
Wine regions of Italy